Anna Christine "Tin" Conwi Patrimonio (born December 29, 1991) is a Filipino tennis player, model, actress and a former reality show contestant. She played for the National University Lady Bulldogs college varsity tennis team.

Personal life 
Tin was the second child of Purefoods TJ Hotdogs basketball superstar Alvin Patrimonio and Cindy Conwi, with her older brother Angelo and younger siblings Clarice and Asher.

Tennis career 
Instead of following in her father's footsteps whose sport was basketball, Tin chose the sport of tennis and started playing tennis at age of 12. She led the Lady Bulldogs to 3 consecutive UAAP Tennis Championships from 2013 to 2015. She was named MVP in UAAP Season 78 women's lawn tennis tournament.

Off the Court 
Patrimonio also participated in Pinoy Big Brother: Unlimited, she became the second athlete to enter the Bahay ni Kuya after Tricia Santos (a Palarong Pambansa veteran) in Teen Clash 2010. Patrimonio didn't make to the Big 4, as she was evicted by day 148. After her eviction from the PBB house, Patrimonio mentioned her openness to portray daring roles, however until now she yet to appear in FHM Philippines magazine in which fellow housemates Jahziel Manabat, Divine Maitland-Smith and Kim de Guzman already posed for. Along with Rachel Anne Daquis, Patrimonio was cited as one of the prettiest athletes in the Philippines. Patrimonio portrayed Gabriela Silang in an indie film Gabriela in 2013 with Carlo Aquino as Diego.

Filmography

Television

Movies

Awards

UAAP 
 UAAP Tennis tournament Most Valuable Player (Season 75, 76, 77)

References

External links 

1991 births
Living people
Pinoy Big Brother contestants
Star Magic
Filipino female tennis players
University Athletic Association of the Philippines players
Filipino female models
People from Cainta
Sportspeople from Rizal
Actresses from Rizal
National University (Philippines) alumni